Flavobacterium dongtanense is a Gram-negative, aerobic, rod-shaped, non-spore-forming and non-motile bacterium from the genus of Flavobacterium which has been isolated from the rhizosphere of wetland reed from Dongtan in China.

References

External links
Type strain of Flavobacterium dongtanense at BacDive -  the Bacterial Diversity Metadatabase

dongtanense
Bacteria described in 2011